14827 Hypnos is a highly eccentric, sub-kilometer-sized carbonaceous asteroid that is thought to be an extinct comet. It is classified as near-Earth object and potentially hazardous asteroid of the Apollo group.

The asteroid was discovered by American astronomer couple Carolyn and Eugene Shoemaker at the Palomar Observatory in California on 5 May 1986. It was named after Hypnos, the Greek god of sleep.

Orbit and classification 

Hypnos orbits the Sun at a distance of 0.9–4.7 AU once every 4 years and 9 months (1,749 days). Its orbit has a high eccentricity of 0.67 and an inclination of 2° with respect to the ecliptic. It is frequently perturbed by Jupiter.

The body's observation arc begins at Anderson Mesa Station the night prior to its official discovery observation at Palomar.

Close approaches 

In 1958, Hypnos passed less than 0.03 AU from both Earth and Mars. Neither planet has been approached so closely by Hypnos since the 862 AD pass of Earth, or will be until the 2214 pass of Earth. It is also a Mars-crosser.

Extinct comet 

Hypnos may be the nucleus of an extinct comet that is covered by a crust several centimeters thick that prevents any remaining volatiles from outgassing.

Physical characteristics 

Hypnos is an assumed carbonaceous C-type asteroid.

Lightcurves 

As of 2018, no rotational lightcurve of Hypnos has been obtained from photometric observations. The asteroids rotation period and spin axis remains unknown. It has a low brightness amplitude of 0.05 magnitude which indicates that the body has a rather spheroidal shape.

Diameter and albedo 

According to the NEOSurvey carried out by NASA's Spitzer Space Telescope, Hypnos measures 520 meters in diameter and its surface has an albedo of 0.22 based on an absolute magnitude of 18.65, while infrared radiometry gave a radar albedo of no more than 0.067 and a diameter of at least 740 meters.

The Collaborative Asteroid Lightcurve Link assumes a standard optical albedo for carbonaceous asteroids 0.057 and derives a diameter of 907 meters with an absolute magnitude of 18.94. The diameter agrees with Tom Gehrels 1994-publication Hazards due to Comets and Asteroids in which he estimated a mean-diameter of 900 meters for Hypnos.

Naming 

This minor planet was named after Hypnos from Greek mythology. He is the god of sleep, son of Nyx and Erebus and twin brother of Thanatos. He enters the sleep of mortals and gives them dreams of foolishness or inspiration. The English word "hypnosis" is derived from his name. The official naming citation was published by the Minor Planet Center on 6 January 2003.

Exploration 
Hypnos may be a potential target for the LICIACube mission after the completion of its primary mission.

References

External links 
 Asteroid Lightcurve Database (LCDB), query form (info )
 Dictionary of Minor Planet Names, Google books
 Asteroids and comets rotation curves, CdR – Observatoire de Genève, Raoul Behrend
 
 
 

014827
Discoveries by Eugene Merle Shoemaker
Discoveries by Carolyn S. Shoemaker
Named minor planets
014827
014827
19860505